N'Zi-Comoé Region is a defunct region of Ivory Coast. From 1997 to 2011, it was a first-level subdivision region. The region's capital was Dimbokro and its area was 19,242 km². Since 2011, the area formerly encompassed by the region is part of Lacs District.

Administrative divisions
At the time of its dissolution, N'Zi-Comoé Region was divided into eight departments: Arrah, Bocanda, Bongouanou, Daoukro, Dimbokro, M'Bahiakro, M'Batto, and Prikro.

Abolition
N'Zi Comoé Region was abolished as part of the 2011 administrative reorganisation of the subdivisions of Ivory Coast. The area formerly encompassed by the region is now part of Lacs District. The territories of the departments of Daoukro, M'Bahiakro, and Prikro became the second-level Iffou Region. The remaining territory—the departments of Bocanda, Bongouanou and Dimbokro—became N'Zi Region. Later, in 2012, Moronou Region was created from what had previously been the territory of Bongouanou Department in N'Zi-Comoé Region.

References

Former regions of Ivory Coast
States and territories disestablished in 2011
2011 disestablishments in Ivory Coast
1997 establishments in Ivory Coast
States and territories established in 1997